Still Night, Still Light is the third studio album by American indie pop band Au Revoir Simone. It was released on Moshi Moshi Records and Our Secret Record Company on May 19, 2009. The album was produced by Thom Monahan.

The remix album, titled Night Light, was released in 2010.

Critical reception

At Metacritic, which assigns a weighted average score out of 100 to reviews from mainstream critics, the album received an average score of 71% based on 15 reviews, indicating "generally favorable reviews".

Track listing

Charts

References

External links
 

2009 albums
Au Revoir Simone albums
Moshi Moshi Records albums
Albums produced by Thom Monahan